Cobalt tricarbonyl nitrosyl is the organocobalt compound with the formula Co(CO)3NO.  It is a dark red volatile oil that is soluble in nonpolar solvents. The compound is one of the simplest metal nitrosyls.  It is highly toxic, reminiscent of the same property for nickel tetracarbonyl.

Synthesis and reactions
Cobalt tricarbonyl nitrosyl is prepared by the treatment of dicobalt octacarbonyl with nitric oxide:
Co2(CO)8 + 2NO → 2Co(CO)3NO + 2CO
Many other methods have been developed.

The complex undergoes substitution readily by Lewis bases such as tertiary phosphines and isocyanides, concomitant with loss of CO.

References

Carbonyl complexes
Nitrosyl complexes
Organocobalt compounds